Fischer's guiara (Euryzygomatomys spinosus), is a spiny rat species found in Argentina, Brazil and Paraguay. It is one of only two species in the genus Euryzygomatomys. Its karyotype has 2n=46 and FN=88.

References

Euryzygomatomys
Mammals described in 1814